This Time... is an album by the American jazz saxophonist and composer Anthony Braxton, recorded in 1970 and released on the BYG Actuel label. As on his previous album, Braxton performs with trumpeter Wadada Leo Smith, violinist Leroy Jenkins and drummer Steve McCall.

Reception
The AllMusic review by Dan Warburton called the album "wild, wonderful, insanely creative, and absolutely timeless".

Track listing
All compositions by Anthony Braxton''
 "Composition No 1" - 13:06 
 "Solo" - 5:42 
 "Small Composition No 1" - 2:23 
 "Small Composition No 2" - 3:07 
 "Small Composition No 3" - 1:05 
 "Small Composition No 4" - 1:59 
 "Small Composition No 5" - 4:19 
 "In the Street" - 3:58 
 "This Time" - 1:46 
Recorded in Paris in January 1970

Personnel
Anthony Braxton - alto saxophone, soprano saxophone, clarinet, contrabass clarinet, flute, sound machine, chimes, vocals
Leo Smith - trumpet, flugelhorn, horns, wood block, siren
Leroy Jenkins - violin, viola, flute, harmonica, accordion
Steve McCall - drums, goblet drum, percussion

References

BYG Actuel albums
Anthony Braxton albums
1970 albums